The 2011–12 Lekhwiya SC season was Lekhwiya's second season in the Qatar Stars League, an association football league in Qatar. Lekhwiya are competing in the 2012 AFC Champions League after qualifying by winning the 2010–11 Qatar Stars League.

Season overview

Lekhwiya commenced their summer transfer activity by signing Iraqi national Nashat Akram from Al Wakrah on July 1. They made arguably one of the biggest summer signings of all the Qatari clubs by signing Algerian international defender Madjid Bougherra from Rangers for £1.7m in August. Big names who departed Lekhwiya included Jasur Hasanov and Abdeslam Ouaddou, both to Qatar SC.

Lekhwiya set up a training camp in UAE. They played Al Ahli in a warm-up match, winning 1-0 courtesy of a Mohammed Razak goal in the 74th minute.

They put pen-to-paper for a sponsorship deal with Masraf Al Rayyan, who will be the first and only sponsors of Lekhwiya, on May 11, 2011.

They participated in the 2011 Qatari Stars Cup, being seeded in group A; the more difficult of the two groups. They advancing through to the semi-finals with 4 wins and 1 loss in the group stage. They faced Al Wakrah in the semi-finals, losing 2-3, with Bakari Koné and Moumouni Dagano scoring a goal each.

Lekhwiya won the league title on March 26, 2012 after a hard fought draw against Al Arabi, with Ali Afif scoring the third-minute goal which proved crucial. This was their second successive title on Djamel Belmadi. They were crowned champions with two games yet to be played. Their league record at the time was 12 wins, 6 draws, and 2 losses.

Lekhwiya were drawn in Group C in the 2012 AFC Champions League, featuring Sepahan, Al-Nasr and Al-Ahli. They selected Jassim Bin Hamad Stadium as their home venue for their champions league matches, as it was the venue of the reigning champions, Al-Sadd. It is the first-ever regional competition Lekhwiya has ever participated in.

On  7 March 2012, Lekhwiya played their first match against Al-Ahli at home. They won the match 1-0 in front of a large home crowd consisting of many supporters of both clubs. Despite Moumouni Dagano missing a penalty early on, Nam Tae-Hee helped his team record a victory by scoring a late goal from midfield.

On 21 March 2012, they played against Al-Nasr in Dubai. Moumouni Dagano scored the only goal in a 2-1 loss. The match was marred by controversy as Lekhwiya had 2 goals ruled offside in the late stages of the game, only to have Amara Diané score the winning goal in additional time.

Squad list
Players and squad numbers last updated on 3 September 2011.Note: Flags indicate national team as has been defined under FIFA eligibility rules. Players may hold more than one non-FIFA nationality.

Reserve team squad information

Competitions

Overview

References

Lekhwiya SC seasons
Lekhwiya